Ireland participated in the Eurovision Song Contest 2006 with the song "Every Song Is a Cry for Love" written and performed by Brian Kennedy, who was internally selected in November 2005 by the Irish broadcaster Raidió Teilifís Éireann (RTÉ) to represent the nation at the 2006 contest in Athens, Greece. RTÉ organised the national final Eurosong 2006 to select the song that Kennedy would perform. Three songs faced a public televote, ultimately resulting in the selection of "Every Song Is a Cry for Love" as the Irish entry.

Ireland competed in the semi-final of the Eurovision Song Contest which took place on 18 May 2006. Performing during the show in position 8, "Every Song Is a Cry for Love" was announced among the top 10 entries of the semi-final and therefore qualified to compete in the final on 20 May. It was later revealed that Ireland placed ninth out of the 23 participating countries in the semi-final with 79 points. In the final, Ireland performed in position 21 and placed tenth out of the 24 participating countries, scoring 93 points.

Background 

Prior to the 2006 Contest, Ireland had participated in the Eurovision Song Contest thirty-nine times since its first entry in 1965. Ireland has won the contest a record seven times in total. The country's first win came in 1970, with then-18-year-old Dana winning with "All Kinds of Everything". Ireland holds the record for being the only country to win the contest three times in a row (in 1992, 1993 and 1994), as well as having the only three-time winner (Johnny Logan, who won in 1980 as a singer, 1987 as a singer-songwriter, and again in 1992 as a songwriter). The Irish entry in 2005, "Love?" performed by Donna and Joe, failed to qualify to the final and achieved Ireland's lowest position in the contest.

The Irish national broadcaster, Raidió Teilifís Éireann (RTÉ), broadcasts the event within Ireland and organises the selection process for the nation's entry. From 2003 to 2005, RTÉ had set up the talent contest You're a Star to choose both the song and performer to compete at Eurovision for Ireland, with the public involved in the selection. For the 2006 Eurovision Song Contest, RTÉ announced alongside their confirmation on 17 July 2005 that You're a Star would not be used to choose the song and performer to represent Ireland at the contest as the show "hasn't delivered in terms of what the Eurovision Song Contest has wanted", as stated by Larry Bass, executive producer of You're a Star.

Before Eurovision

Artist selection 
RTÉ confirmed their intentions to participate at the 2006 Eurovision Song Contest on 17 July 2005. On 14 November 2005, the broadcaster announced that they had internally selected Brian Kennedy to represent Ireland in Helsinki. Along with the announcement that Kennedy would represent Ireland on 14 November, RTÉ announced that a national final would be held to select his song.

Eurosong 2006 
On 14 November 2005, RTÉ opened a submission period where composers were able to submit their songs for the competition until 27 January 2006. At the closing of the deadline, 1,300 songs were received. The competing songs were selected by a three-member jury panel with members appointed by RTÉ: former contest winning composers Brendan Graham and Shay Healy, and singer and songwriter Paul Brady. The four finalist songs were announced on 11 February 2006, however the song "Strong Enough", written by Barry Walsh, was disqualified from the competition on 13 February 2006 due to not meeting the EBU eligibility criteria. The national final was broadcast on RTÉ One as well as online via the broadcaster's official website rte.ie during a special edition of The Late Late Show held on 17 February 2006 and hosted by Pat Kenny. The national final featured commentary from a panel that consisted of former contest winners Linda Martin, Niamh Kavanagh, Paul Harrington and Charlie McGettigan. Public televoting held in Ireland and Northern Ireland selected "Every Song Is a Cry for Love" as the winning song.

Controversy 
The selection of "Every Song Is a Cry for Love" as the Irish entry provoked controversy after it was revealed that the song, written by Brian Kennedy himself, was submitted after the closing of the song submission deadline. The songs selection process was also criticised by Irish media, including John Waters of The Irish Times and IMRO publisher Johnny Lappin who stated that the jury had only reviewed less than 4% of all the submissions as RTÉ were "overwhelmed with the volume of entries", as well as claiming that RTÉ had influenced the final results which they offered those that voted for the winning song to enter a draw for a car, which could "prejudice the viewers into voting, not for the song they personally felt was the best but for the song most likely to win" due to all four panellists during the show being in favour of the eventual winning song "Every Song Is a Cry for Love".

At Eurovision 
According to Eurovision rules, all nations with the exceptions of the host country, the "Big Four" (France, Germany, Spain and the United Kingdom) and the ten highest placed finishers in the 2005 contest are required to qualify from the semi-final in order to compete for the final; the top ten countries from the semi-final progress to the final. On 21 March 2006, a special allocation draw was held which determined the running order for the semi-final, to be held on 18 May 2006, and the final, to be held on 20 May 2006. Ireland was drawn to perform in position 8, following the entry from Belgium and before the entry from Cyprus.

In Ireland, the semi-final and the final were broadcast on RTÉ One with commentary by Marty Whelan. The two shows were also broadcast via radio on RTÉ Radio 1 with commentary by Larry Gogan. The Irish spokesperson, who announced the Irish votes during the final, was former contest winner Eimear Quinn.

"Every Song Is a Cry for Love" was released on April 21, 2006, and eventually peaked at Number 4 on the Irish Singles Chart.

Semi-final 
Brian Kennedy took part in technical rehearsals on 11 and 13 May, followed by dress rehearsals on 17 and 18 May. The Irish performance, which was also the 1000th song performed in Eurovision history, featured Brian Kennedy dressed in a black suit and joined on stage by four backing vocalists, three of them located at the right side of the stage with the remaining one located at the left side of the stage and also played the guitar: Calum McColl, Fran King, Paula Gilbert and Una Healy.

At the end of the show, Ireland was announced as having finished in the top 10 and consequently qualifying for the grand final. It was later revealed that Ireland placed ninth in the semi-final, receiving a total of 79 points.

Final 
Shortly after the semi-final, a winners' press conference was held for the ten qualifying countries. As part of this press conference, the qualifying artists took part in a draw to determine the running order for the final and Ireland was drawn to perform in position 21, following the entry from Croatia and before the entry from Sweden.

Brian Kennedy once again took part in dress rehearsals on 19 and 20 May before the final. Brian Kennedy performed a repeat of his semi-final performance during the final on 20 May. Ireland placed tenth in the final, scoring 93 points.

Voting 
Below is a breakdown of points awarded to Ireland and awarded by Ireland in the semi-final and grand final of the contest. The nation awarded its 12 points to Lithuania in the semi-final and the final of the contest.

Points awarded to Ireland

Points awarded by Ireland

References

2006
Countries in the Eurovision Song Contest 2006
Eurovision
Eurovision